Isenbüttel is a municipality in the district of Gifhorn, in Lower Saxony, Germany. It is situated approximately 6 km southeast of Gifhorn, and 20 km north of Braunschweig.

Isenbüttel is also the seat of the Samtgemeinde Isenbüttel ("collective municipality").

References

Gifhorn (district)